The 1987 Nippon Professional Baseball season was the 38th season of operation for the league.

Regular season standings

Central League

Pacific League

Japan Series

Seibu Lions won the series 4-2.

See also
1987 Major League Baseball season

References

1987 in baseball
1987 in Japanese sport